Marcin Staniszewski (born 14 January 1997) is a Polish professional footballer who plays as a goalkeeper for FSV Union Fürstenwalde.

Club career
On 19 August 2020 he signed with Bytovia Bytów.

References

External links

1997 births
People from Koszalin
Sportspeople from West Pomeranian Voivodeship
Living people
Polish footballers
Poland youth international footballers
Association football goalkeepers
Tur Turek players
Puszcza Niepołomice players
Arka Gdynia players
Bytovia Bytów players
Sokół Ostróda players
FSV Union Fürstenwalde players
Ekstraklasa players
I liga players
II liga players
Regionalliga players
Polish expatriate footballers
Expatriate footballers in Germany
Polish expatriate sportspeople in Germany